Bessonov (masculine) or Bessonova (feminine) is a Russian surname; its Ukrainian transliteration is Bezsonov/Bezsonova. Notable people with the surname include:
Anna Bessonova (born 1984), Ukrainian rhythmic gymnast
Evgeny Bessonov (born 1968), Russian politician
Gennady Bessonov (disambiguation)
Ivan Bessonov (born 2002), Russian pianist and composer
Pyotr Bessonov (1828–1898), Russian folklorist 
Volodymyr Bezsonov (born 1958), Ukrainian football manager and former player
Vsevolod Bessonov (1932–1970), Soviet Navy submarine commander
Sergei Bessonov (1892–1941), Soviet politician

Russian-language surnames